"Prince Ali" and its reprise are two musical numbers from the 1992 Disney animated film Aladdin. The first part was performed by Robin Williams in his role as the Genie and the reprise is performed by Jonathan Freeman in his role as Jafar. The song performed by Williams was nominated for the Golden Globe Award for Best Original Song at the 50th Golden Globe Awards in 1993.

Production
The film version cut a conceived intro for the song and two extra verses in the middle of "Prince Ali".

Soundtrack.net explains how "Prince Ali (reprise)" was conceived:

Synopsis

"Prince Ali" is a flamboyant number sung by the Genie (Robin Williams) as he introduces Agrabah to Prince Ali Ababwa, Aladdin's royal alter ego, with a giant caravan. A reprise of the song has Jafar (Jonathan Freeman) unmask Aladdin as a poor thief. An early reprise of the song in the stage musical has the Sultan announcing to the city's residents that his daughter Jasmine is to marry the prince.

Cultural references
The Genie character is known for spouting elements of contemporary pop culture, so all his songs contain anachronistic references. During the song, Robin Williams imitates a Thanksgiving Parade commentor ("Don't they look lovely, June?"), Walter Brennan, and Ethel Merman.

Critical reception
AllMusic wrote "Robin Williams' bravura performance as the magic lamp on songs such as "Friend Like Me" and "Prince Ali" are justifiably credited as the album's highlights."

Director/choreographer of the stage musical, Casey Nicholaw said that "'Prince Ali', too, is a huge production number 'where the dancers wear four costumes each'". TalkingBroadway described the song as one of the three showstoppers of the musical, along with "Friend Like Me" and "A Whole New World". NBC New York dubbed it "Act II's standout".

In popular culture 
This song is playable in the video game Just Dance 2014.

Will Smith, as the Genie, performs the song in the 2019 live-action remake of ''Aladdin. This version incorporates some hip hop musical elements, and has made some changes to the lyrics. For example, "Sunday Salam" has been changed to "Friday Salam" to reflect the Islamic holy day. It also omits reference to Prince Ali having slaves by changing it to stating that Ali has "ten thousand servants and flunkies".

Charts
Will Smith version

Certifications
Will Smith version

References

Songs about princes
Songs about fictional male characters
1992 songs
Songs with lyrics by Howard Ashman
Songs with music by Alan Menken
Disney Renaissance songs
Songs from Aladdin (franchise)
Songs with lyrics by Tim Rice
Will Smith songs
Song recordings produced by Alan Menken